Adam Cieślar (born 18 December 1992) is a retired Polish Nordic combined skier. He was born in Cieszyn. He competed at the FIS Nordic World Ski Championships 2011 in Oslo, and at the 2014 Winter Olympics in Sochi.

References

External links 
 
 
 
 

1992 births
Living people
Nordic combined skiers at the 2014 Winter Olympics
Nordic combined skiers at the 2018 Winter Olympics
Polish male Nordic combined skiers
Olympic Nordic combined skiers of Poland
People from Cieszyn
Sportspeople from Silesian Voivodeship
Universiade medalists in nordic combined
Universiade gold medalists for Poland
Universiade silver medalists for Poland
Competitors at the 2013 Winter Universiade
Competitors at the 2015 Winter Universiade
Competitors at the 2017 Winter Universiade
21st-century Polish people